The Last Winter is a 1960 Danish war film directed by Frank Dunlop, Anker Sørensen and Edvin Tiemroth. It was entered into the 2nd Moscow International Film Festival.

Cast
 Tony Britton as Stephen Burton
 Dieter Eppler as Oberleutnant Ahlbach
 John Wittig as Læge John Sørensen
 Birgitte Federspiel as Anne Sørensen
 Axel Strøbye as Erik Sørensen
 Lise Ringheim as Eva Sørensen
 Preben Kaas as Gustav
 Hanne Winther-Jørgensen as Nina
 Hugo Herrestrup as Klaus
 Anker Taasti as Poul
 Preben Neergaard as Peter
 Ernst Bruun Olsen as Den fremmede modstandsmand
 Jørgen Weel as Niels Jacobsen

References

External links
 

1960 films
1960 war films
1960s Danish-language films
Danish black-and-white films
Best Danish Film Bodil Award winners
Danish war films